Pressbooks is an open source content management system designed for creating books. It is based on WordPress, and can export content in many formats for ebooks, webbooks or print.

Overview 
Pressbooks is developed by Book Oven, Inc., a Montréal-based company founded in 2011 by Hugh McGuire (who also founded the audio book platform LibriVox).

 Originally aimed at self-publishing authors, in 2017 Pressbooks shifted its focus to work with universities on academic and textbook publishing.

The software is built on WordPress Multisite with modification of the admin and reader interfaces to reflect the intention of authoring books, a choice of themes for formating books, and to allow the export of books in print-ready PDF, mobi, ePub, and many other open formats. It is available as a hosted service for self-publishers (pressbooks.com), supported institutional hosting  (PressbooksEdu), third party hosts, or self-hosting of the software available from pressbooks.org.

Pressbooks is often used to create open textbooks and other forms of open educational resource, for example at the following institutions:
 University of Hawaii
 University of California, Berkeley
 University of Kansas
 eCampusOntario
 Unizin Consortium
 Indiana University
 Illinois University
 BCcampus
 Michigan State University

References

External links
 

Document management systems
Free educational software